Flavio Raffo (born 14 January 1972) is an Italian football manager and a former footballer.

Personal life
Flavio is a modern football coach who has a good knowledge about the different fields of the game in the past and present time. He is known for his mature personality towards the fans and his opponents. He believes that physical fitness is the thing of utmost importance for all footballers which helps them establish a positive attitude within themselves. According to the Rome-born coach, if a player desires to win then he has to be both mentally and technically superior to others. His thoughts on football's future back in his home country, Italy are highly appreciable. He believes that the need of the hour is to restructure and re-plan the football schools in Italy with the aim of making a player better mentally, technically and physically instead of thinking of the financial profit. According to him, the work is hard but not impossible.

Managerial career
Flavio holds the UEFA Pro Licence, the highest football coaching qualification. He received the UEFA Pro Licence on 4 May 2012 from the Italian Football Federation.

Ostia Mare Lido Calcio
He began his managerial career in 2007 with Ostia-based club, A.S. Ostia Mare Lido Calcio.

Pomezia Calcio
In 2008, he moved to Pomezia where he was appointed as the head coach of Pomezia Calcio on a one-year contract.

Academie Ny Antsika
He first moved out of Italy in 2009 to Africa and more accurately to Madagascar where he was appointed as the head coach of THB Champions League club, Academie Ny Antsika. In the 2010-11 THB Champions League, he had a successful run with the club helping them secure the first position in the Group B in 1st Phase with 15 points from 5 wins and the first position in the Group A in 2nd Phase with 9 points from 3 wins.

Africa Sports d'Abidjan
In 2011, he again moved out of Italy to an African country and this time to Ivory Coast where he was appointed as the head coach of Ligue 1 club, Africa Sports d'Abidjan. He helped the Abidjan-based club secure the second position in the 2011-12 Ligue 1 in the Group A during the regular season.

Al-Ittihad
In 2013, he again moved out of Italy and this time to Middle East and more accurately to Oman where he was appointed as the head coach of Oman Professional League club, Al-Ittihad Club.

Muktijoddha Sangsad
In December 2014, he moved to Bangladesh where on 28 December 2014, he was appointed as the head coach of Bangladesh Premier League club, Muktijoddha Sangsad KC. He helped the Dhaka-based club achieve the runners-up position in the 2014–15 Bangladesh Federation Cup. Just after a month with the Dhaka-based club, the Italy-born coach decided to terminate his contract with the Bangladeshi club having failed to reach an agreement on the salary issue.

Achievements as manager

Honors
With Academie Ny Antsika
THB Champions League (1):
Winners 2010-11 (1st Phase - Group B) (2nd Phase - Group 1)

With Africa Sports d'Abidjan
Ligue 1 (0):
Runners-up 2011-12 (regular-season - Group A)

With Muktijoddha Sangsad
Bangladesh Federation Cup (0):
Runners-up 2014-15

References

External links
Flavio Raffo - Official Website
Flavio Raffo - YouTube

1972 births
Living people
Footballers from Rome
Italian footballers
A.S. Roma players
S.S.D. Lucchese 1905 players
Cosenza Calcio 1914 players
Italian football managers
Italian expatriate football managers
Al-Ittihad Club (Salalah) managers
Oman Professional League managers
Expatriate football managers in Madagascar
Italian expatriate sportspeople in Madagascar
Expatriate football managers in Ivory Coast
Italian expatriate sportspeople in Ivory Coast
Expatriate football managers in Oman
Italian expatriate sportspeople in Oman
Expatriate football managers in Bangladesh
Italian expatriate sportspeople in Bangladesh
Association football midfielders